Sebastian Matthews (born August 25, 1965) is an American poet, and writer.

Life
He graduated from the University of Michigan with an MFA.

His books include In My Father's Footsteps (memoir), We Generous (poetry), Miracle Day (poetry) and Beginner's Guide to a Head-on Collision (hybrid).

His father is William Matthews. His mother is Marie Harris.

He lives with his wife in Asheville, North Carolina.

Awards
 Bernard De Voto Fellow in Nonfiction
 Vermont Studio Center residency.

Works
"Messages in a Bottle: Notes from an Unlikely Curator," an essay about curating an exhibition of collage artist Ray Johnson's work at Black Mountain College + Arts Museum, in Blackbird Fall 2010, v9n2
"Barbershop Quartet, East Village Grille", American Life in Poetry
"Song for My Father", Virginia Quarterly Review, Winter 2004 
"Buying Wine", Virginia Quarterly Review, Winter 2004 
"GHOST BOXES", La Petite Zine
 
  (the Hollyridge Press Chapbook Series)

Memoir

Editor

References

External links
Sebastian Matthews, contributor index on Blackbird Fall 2010, v9n2
Sebastian Matthews's "Messages in a Bottle: Notes from an Unlikely Curator," essay about curating an exhibition of collage artist Ray Johnson's work at Black Mountain College + Arts Museum in Blackbird Fall 2010, v9n2
"Sebastian Matthews reads “I Am” by John Clare", Poets on Poets
"Sebastian Matthews", Fishouse
"Poet explains his own creative process", Herald-Journal, Jeremy Jones, August 17, 2008 
"We Generous: Sebastian Matthews Chronicles His Own Flight", Natures,April 06, 2007 

Living people
American male poets
University of Michigan alumni
Warren Wilson College faculty
1965 births
21st-century American poets
21st-century American male writers